"Black Skin Blue Eyed Boys" is a song written by Guyanese-British musician Eddy Grant and recorded in London in 1970 by his band the Equals.  Their recording, produced by Grant, reached number 9 on the UK Singles Chart in January 1971 and was the band's last chart hit.

The Equals were noted for being one of the first ethnically-mixed bands in the UK.  The song was described by journalist Chris Taylor as "a hymn to diversity" which "explicitly linked its racial theme with the anti-Vietnam war sentiment of the time". The song is also notable for heralding a shift in the band's sound, from the Caribbean-influenced pop-rock which had given them their initial success in the late 1960s to an embrace of funk music. Lloyd Bradley has described the song as "the first recognisably black British statement - a song that saw itself as being (British) in both words and music, and announced that London's indigenous black soul music was entirely self-sufficient".

In 2019, "Black Skin Blue Eyed Boys" was covered by the Specials as the opening track on their album Encore.  Lynval Golding of the Specials said: "I've always thought of The Equals as our spiritual ancestors: they were a massive inspiration to all of us, genuine heroes.... Doing their song on the album is a tribute, our way of thanking them for everything they've done and how much they meant to us...".

The song was also covered by Australian band Hush, and released as a single in 1973. The single was taken from Hush's album Aloud 'N' Live.

References

1970 songs
1970 singles
Songs written by Eddy Grant
The Equals songs
President Records singles
The Specials songs